The Constitution of Burundi was adopted by referendum on February 28, 2005 and promulgated on March 18, 2005.

On May 12, 2017, a draft revision of the constitution of Burundi was announced. The final draft was announced on October 25, 2017, and provides for the creation of a post of Prime Minister, the transition from a five-year to a seven year presidential term, the term limit will be one consecutive and the threshold of adoption of the laws would go from two thirds to the absolute majority. With these changes, the Arusha Accords are de facto abrogated. In January 2018, during the campaign for the referendum, the Burundian authorities arrested opponents of the changes. Finally, the text also provides for the possibility of restoring the monarchy.

The referendum was held on 17 May, 2018. The constitutional reform was promulgated on 7 June, 2018.

See also 
 Constitution of the Kingdom of Burundi

References

External links 
Text of the 2005 Constitution

Law of Burundi
Burundi
Government of Burundi
Politics of Burundi